In anatomy, flexor carpi radialis is a muscle of the human forearm that acts to flex and (radially) abduct the hand. The Latin carpus means wrist; hence flexor carpi is a flexor of the wrist.

Origin and insertion
The flexor carpi radialis is one of four muscles in the superficial layer of the anterior compartment of the forearm. 

This muscle originates from the medial epicondyle of the humerus as part of the common flexor tendon. It runs just laterally of flexor digitorum superficialis and inserts on the anterior aspect of the base of the second metacarpal, and has small slips to both the third metacarpal and trapezium tuberosity.

The tendon of the flexor carpi radialis is visible on the anterior surface of the forearm, just proximal to the wrist, when the wrist is flexed. It is the tendon seen most lateral, closest to the thumb.

Nerve and artery
Like most flexors of the anterior compartment of the forearm, FCR is innervated by the median nerve, specifically by axons from cervical nerve roots C6 and C7. The muscle receives its blood supply from the ulnar artery.

Exercises
The muscle, like all flexors of the forearm, can be strengthened by exercises that resist its flexion. A wrist roller can be used, Zottman Curls, and wrist curls with dumbbells can also be performed.

See also
 Flexor retinaculum of the hand
 Flexor carpi ulnaris

Additional images

References 

 Muscles of the upper limb
Forearm